UFC on Fox: Johnson vs. Benavidez 2 (also known as UFC on Fox 9) was a mixed martial arts event held on December 14, 2013, at the Sleep Train Arena in Sacramento, California. It was the UFC's third visit to the venue, after UFC 65 and UFC 73.

Background
A UFC Lightweight title bout between the former champion Anthony Pettis and former top contender T. J. Grant was targeted for this event. However, Grant revealed in mid-September that he has yet to be medically cleared after suffering a concussion in training and would not be eligible to compete on December 14 and opted to decline the bout.  Pettis was then expected to face Josh Thomson in the event headliner. However, on November 10, 2013, it was announced that Pettis was injured and the bout was cancelled.  The new main event was a rematch for the Flyweight title between Demetrious Johnson and Joseph Benavidez.

Co-featured on the card was a bout between top bantamweight contenders Urijah Faber and Michael McDonald.

Ian McCall was expected to face Scott Jorgensen at the event.  However, McCall was forced out of the bout with an injury and replaced by John Dodson.  Then on December 3, Dodson himself was forced from the bout after sustaining a knee injury.  Jorgensen instead faced former Bellator Bantamweight Champion Zach Makovsky.

Jamie Varner was expected to face Pat Healy at this event. However, Varner pulled out of the bout due to injury and was replaced by Bobby Green

Kelvin Gastelum was expected to  face Court McGee at this event. However, Gastelum pulled out of the bout, citing an undisclosed injury and was replaced by Ryan LaFlare.

John Moraga was expected to face Darren Uyenoyama at the event.  However, Moraga pulled out of the bout with an undisclosed injury and was replaced by promotional newcomer Alp Ozkilic.

Carlos Condit was expected to face Matt Brown in a welterweight bout on the main card.  However, on December 7, 2013, it was announced that Brown had to pull out of the bout due to herniated discs in his back. Sources close to the promotion on Saturday, December 7, 2013, told MMAjunkie no replacement was sought to meet Condit on the card, thus removing the fight entirely from the event.

This was the first MMA event held at the Sleep Train Arena since WEC 48 on April 24, 2010, where Johnson, Faber, Mendes and Jorgensen also fought. Faber headlined or co-headlined each of the arena's previous four MMA events.

Results

Bonus awards
The following fighters were awarded $50,000 bonuses.

 Fight of The Night: Edson Barboza vs. Danny Castillo
 Knockout of The Night: Demetrious Johnson
 Submission of the Night: Urijah Faber

Reported payout
The following is the reported payout to the fighters as reported to the California State Athletic Commission. It does not include sponsor money or "locker room" bonuses often given by the UFC and also do not include the UFC's traditional "fight night" bonuses.

Demetrious Johnson: $175,000 ($50,000 win bonus) def. Joseph Benavidez: $42,000
Urijah Faber: $200,000 ($100,000 win bonus) def. Michael McDonald: $17,000
Chad Mendes: $90,000 ($45,000 win bonus) def. Nik Lentz: $29,000
Joe Lauzon: $60,000 ($30,000 win bonus) def. Mac Danzig: $32,000
Ryan LaFlare: $20,000 ($10,000 win bonus) def. Court McGee: $10,000
Edson Barboza: $52,000 ($26,000 win bonus) def. Danny Castillo: $31,000
Bobby Green: $36,000 ($18,000 win bonus) def. Pat Healy: $25,000
Zach Makovsky: $20,000 ($10,000 win bonus) def. Scott Jorgensen: $26,000
Sam Stout: $60,000 ($30,000 win bonus) def. Cody McKenzie: $12,000
Abel Trujillo: $20,000 ($10,000 win bonus) def. Roger Bowling: $12,000
Alptekin Ozkilic: $16,000 ($8,000 win bonus) def. Darren Uyenoyama: $12,000

See also
List of UFC events
2013 in UFC

References

Fox UFC
2013 in mixed martial arts
Events in Sacramento, California
Mixed martial arts in Sacramento, California
Sports competitions in Sacramento, California
2013 in sports in California